The Norwegian Communications Authority, prior to 2015 the Norwegian Post and Telecommunications Authority is a Norwegian government agency responsible for controlling and regulating the telecommunication and postal sector of Norway. The agencies main responsibilities are controlling the telecom market, issuing frequency concessions and telephone numbers.

The authority has a close relationship with the Norwegian Competition Authority and the Norwegian Consumer Council. It is located in Lillesand and is financed though fees charged to the telecom companies. The authority dates back to 1987 when it was created as the Norwegian Telecommunications Authority. In 1997 it also received responsibility for the postal sector.

External links
 Web site

Communication Authority
Communications authorities
Telecommunications in Norway
Government agencies established in 1987
Postal system of Norway
Organisations based in Lillesand
1987 establishments in Norway
Ministry of Transport (Norway)
Regulation in Norway